Gausvik or Gausvika is a village in Harstad Municipality in Troms og Finnmark county, Norway. Gausvik Church is in the village.

References

Harstad
Villages in Troms